Sheikh Nahyan bin Mubarak Al Nahyan (born 1951) heads the United Arab Emirates Ministry of Culture, Youth, and Social Development.

Biography
He is the son of Mubarak bin Mohammed Al Nahyan, grandson of Mohammad bin Khalifa bin Zayed Al Nahyan, great-grandson of Khalifa bin Zayed bin Khalifa Al Nahyan, and great-great-grandson of Zayed bin Khalifa Al Nahyan. Hamdan bin Mubarak Al Nahyan, Minister of Public Works, is his brother. Sheikh Nahyan was also Chancellor of two of the UAE's three government-sponsored institutions of higher learning: United Arab Emirates University, established in 1976, and the Higher Colleges of Technology, established in 1988; and president of the third, Zayed University, established in 1998 until removed from these positions in April 2013. 

Prior to March 17, 2013, he headed the Ministry of Higher Education and Scientific Research. He is also the chairman of CERT (Centre of Excellence for Applied Research and Training), the commercial arm of the Higher Colleges of Technology, established in 1996. For several years, Sheikh Nahyan has been the sponsor of the Emirates Natural History Group with chapters in Abu Dhabi and Al Ain. One of the two awards presented annually by the Abu Dhabi chapter is the Sh. Mubarak Award, named for Sheikh Nahyan's father.

He is chairman of Sandooq al Watan, a social initiative. Since 2021, Sheikh Nahyan holds the honorary degree of Doctor of Social Sciences by the University of Balamand.

As Minister of State for Tolerance 
On 17 October 2020, a curator of Hay’s Literary Festival, Caitlin McNamara, accused Sheikh Nahyan bin Mubarak Al Nahyan of sexually assaulting her on 14 February 2020, 11 days before the launch of festival. According to McNamara, Al Nahyan invited her to an official dinner to discuss the Hay festival. However, according to McNamara Al Nahyan called her at a remote villa on a private island and sexually assaulted her. Al Nahyan has denied the sex assault allegations.

Investments

Nahyan is Chairman of Warid Telecom International (a regional telecoms group based out of Abu Dhabi with operations in Pakistan, Bangladesh, Uganda, Congo Brazzaville, and Ivory Coast). He is also chairman of the Abu Dhabi Group, Union National Bank, and United Bank Limited.

Pakistan
Nahyan has taken a keen interest in Pakistan–United Arab Emirates Friendship. He is one of two Emirati royals, that own estate with a personal game reserve near the mouth of the Indus River in Sindh Province used for falconeering and hunting; the other royal being the late Sheikh Zayed. Nahyan's Abu Dhabi United Group is a large investor in Pakistan. It owns Bank Alfalah, Warid Telecom, Wateen Telecom, Taavun and many more in Pakistan. He is also Founder Chairman of Bank Alfalah.

Sheikh Nahyan Mubarak Al Nahyan is also recipient of Pakistan's highest civilian award, the Hilal-e-Pakistan, which was conferred upon him by the President of Pakistan in 2005.

Georgia
In Georgia, Nahyan invested in Kor Standard Bank (now Terabank) and Biltmore Hotel Tbilisi.

Controversy
In April 2021, a British woman (Ms. McNamara, 32) claimed that she was sexually assaulted by accused Nahyan bin Mubarak Al Nahyan. She claimed that she allegedly suffered at the hands of Sheikh Nahyan bin Mubarak Al Nahyan on 14 February 2020 at a private residence in Abu Dhabi. The Crown Prosecution Service said it could not bring charges because the alleged offence happened abroad.

See also
 Ministry of Higher Education and Scientific Research
 Abu Dhabi Music & Arts Foundation

References

1951 births
Living people
People from Abu Dhabi
Emirati politicians
Emirati businesspeople
Nahyan Bin Mubarak Al
Culture ministers of the United Arab Emirates
Education ministers of the United Arab Emirates
Academic staff of Zayed University
Recipients of Hilal-i-Pakistan
Heads of universities in the United Arab Emirates